Kasim Kutay (born 13 May 1965) is the CEO of Novo Holdings A/S, an investment fund that manages investments and assets for the Novo Nordisk Foundation. He holds British citizenship.

Novo Holdings is one of the world's largest life science investors, and manages a diversified portfolio of equities, bonds, real estate and infrastructure assets, as well as private equity investments. Novo Holdings manages assets worth approximately DKK 710 billion Danish Kroners (approximately $106bn).

Kasim Kutay is a former investment banker, focusing on the healthcare sector. Kasim Kutay assumed the role of CEO at Novo Holdings A/S on September 1, 2016, following the departure of Eivind Kolding.

Kasim Kutay joined Novo Holdings A/S after more than two decades working within investment banking.

He began his career at the investment bank Morgan Stanley in 1989, rising to the post of chairman of its European Healthcare Group. After 18 years at Morgan Stanley, Kasim Kutay worked at a private US investment firm, Sun Group, prior to joining Moelis & Company in 2009.

He joined Moelis & Company in 2009, where he worked for seven years, serving as Co-head of Europe and member of its Management Committee until he joined Novo Holdings A/S in 2016.

Kasim Kutay is a member of the board of directors at Novozymes, Novo Nordisk A/S, Evotec SE and a former board member of Convatec up until July 3 - 2018.

Kasim Kutay is also a charity board member of the Chelsea and Westminster NHS Foundation Trustt.

Education 
Kasim Kutay holds a BSc in Economics and an MSc in Politics of the World Economy, both from the LSE (London School of Economics and Political Science).

Prior to studying at LSE (London School of Economics and Political Science), Kasim Kutay went to the American Community School in London.

Early life and career 
Kasim Kutay is a citizen of the United Kingdom. He was born in Alexandria, Egypt on 13 May 1965 to a Turkish father and Syrian mother.

The family moved to Lebanon until the Lebanese Civil War broke out in 1975 where the family relocated to London, United Kingdom.

He studied at the London School of Economics and Political Science, where he attained his Master of Science in Economics in 1987.

Kasim Kutay began his career, with his first job as a graduate trainee at Morgan Stanley in 1989. Kasim Kutay spent 18 years at Morgan Stanley advising mainly healthcare companies.

He joined Moelis & Company in 2009, where he served as Co-head of Europe and member of its Management Committee until he joined Novo Holdings A/S in 2016.

Novo Holdings A/S 
Kasim Kutay was appointed CEO of Novo Holdings A/S in June 2016, succeeding Eivind Kolding.

Kasim Kutay was very familiar to Novo Holdings A/S before assuming the role of CEO, having previously advised the company over many years on both disposals and acquisitions. He has also advised several other Danish healthcare companies including William Demant and Lundbeck.

Novo Holdings A/S manages approximately DKK 710 billion Danish Kroners (approximately $106bn) worth of assets.

Philanthropy and public positions 
Kasim Kutay has written on and advocated for the need for greater investment and policy changes to tackle the pandemic of antimicrobial resistance (A Plan to Avert a ‘Superbug’ Pandemic).

In 2018, Novo Holdings A/S launched REPAIR, a $165 million fund solely dedicated to investing in companies researching new antibiotics (REPAIR Impact Fund · Novo Holdings launches US$165m impact fund to combat antimicrobial resistance.  

Kasim Kutay is an advocate for the greater adoption of biotech solutions in industry and agriculture to assist in the green transition and the need for a quicker bioindustrial approval process in Europe to match US timelines. Novo Holdings is an active investor in bioindustrial companies, with a portfolio of eighteen companies in the sector.

Kasim Kutay has been involved in the launch of Best For You, a new model of care for adolescent mental health, based at the Chelsea and Westminster Hospital (Best For You -video- CW+).

Kasim Kutay has written on the need for capital markets to evolve to be more conducive to companies seeking to pursue a “stakeholder” model by restraining certain types of hostile mergers and acquisitions (Kasim Kutay (telegraph.co.uk).

Personal life
Kasim Kutay currently resides in Denmark and is married to architect Maha Arakji Kutay.

The couple have three children.

References

1965 births
Living people 
Investment in the United Kingdom 
Alumni of the London School of Economics
British billionaires
Danish chief executives
British chief executives 
British people of Egyptian descent
British people of Turkish descent
British people of Syrian descent
British businesspeople 
British investors 
Morgan Stanley people